Rotha is a village in the municipality Sangerhausen, Mansfeld-Südharz district, Saxony-Anhalt, Germany.

Rotha was first mentioned in a charter from 1347 as Rote. Until 1 October 2005 Rotha was an independent municipality within the Sangerhausen municipal association (Verwaltungsgemeinschaft Sangerhausen), together with 9 other municipalities (i.e. the town Sangerhausen and 8 other villages). On 1 October 2005 the municipal association was dissolved and these 9 villages were incorporated into Sangerhausen. Later 5 other municipalities/villages were also annexed and currently Rotha is one of the 14 villages surrounding Sangerhausen within the municipality Sangerhausen.

A central building in Rotha is the 17th century St. Nicholas church.

Former municipalities in Saxony-Anhalt
Mansfeld-Südharz
Villages in the Harz